The Playa Rich Project is a compilation presented by American rapper Spice 1. It was released November 14, 2000 on Mobb Status Entertainment. The album features performances by Spice 1, Yukmouth, RBL Posse, C-Bo, Outlawz, Jayo Felony, Tray Dee, Three 6 Mafia, B-Legit, Hot Boyz and Yukmouth.

The song, "Ride Or Die", was later re-released on the 2001 Criminalz album Criminal Activity. Another song, "Ride 4 Me", was also re-released in 2001, on the C-Bo compilation, C-Bo's Best Appearances.

Critical reception

Allmusic - "...sporting some of the rugged, hardcore gangsta rappers we expect...it's still the same gangsta tales laid on staccato funk grooves that has made Spice 1 so famous on the West Coast gangsta rap scene."

Track listing
 "Touch Me/Feel Me/Smell Me" (Spice 1)
 "Servin' It Hot" (Hot Boyz, Big Tymers & Servin' tha World Click)
 "Ain't Your Average" (Outlawz)
 "Ready 4 War" (Mr. Serv-On & Court Dog)
 "Art Of War" (RBL Posse & Playaz on da Run)
 "Face Down" (Three 6 Mafia)
 "Ride Or Die" (Spice 1, Tray Dee, Jayo Felony & Yukmouth)
 "As Real As They Come" (Ghetto Mafia)
 "Down Wit' Us" (Riderlife)
 "East Bay Anthem" (3 Way Funk)
 "Hollar At Me" (B-Legit & Sean T)
 "Playaz Paradise" (No Good)
 "You Can't Tell Me" (2-Ton)
 "Ride 4 Me" (C-Bo, Rod-Dee & Spice 1)

References

External links
[ The Playa Rich Project] at Allmusic
The Playa Rich Project at Tower Records

2000 compilation albums
Spice 1 compilation albums
Gangsta rap compilation albums